XHQY-FM is a radio station in Toluca, State of Mexico. Broadcasting on 103.7 FM, carries the La Bestia format of its owner, Grupo Audiorama. and presently is operated by Salvador Pérez Habib.

History

XEQY received its concession on January 11, 1965. It operated on 1360 kHz with 500 watts. In the early 2000s, it moved to 1200.

The station was previously owned by Grupo ACIR, which programmed it with a news format as "QY Noticias", and a group that programmed it with a variety format known as Atmósfera. In 2015, control passed to Radiorama, which instituted its Bestia Grupera format.

On July 2, 2018, XEQY migrated from AM to FM as XHQY-FM 103.7 and simultaneously changed from La Bestia Grupera to Retro, a Spanish oldies format. It lasted just over three months, with XHQY returning to Bestia Grupera in September. The AM was shut off for good at 11:59 p.m. on June 11, 2020.

References

Radio stations in the State of Mexico